Wells Creek is an unincorporated community in Anderson County, located in the U.S. state of Texas. It is located within the Palestine, Texas micropolitan area.

History
Wells Creek is named for the nearby Wells Creek, which was also named for Samuel G. Wells, who was issued a grant for the land that the community and a majority of the creek are located today. It had a flag stop station and several scattered houses in the 1930s, and only one home was located in the community in 1982.

Geography

Education
Public education in Wells Creek is provided by the Palestine Independent School District.

References

Unincorporated communities in Anderson County, Texas
Unincorporated communities in Texas